Traveller Without Luggage is a 1961 Australian television film directed by Henri Safran and starring Ric Hutton. It was Safran's first English language work.

Plot
A man (Ric Hutton) has been in an asylum for 16 years suffering from loss of memory. He is without the memories that the normal person carries with him as "luggage". On the advice of the asylum psychiatrist, he sets out to find his past and spends 24 hours with a family who believe he is their lost son. He discovers he was a seducer, a wife-stealer, and generally vile character, and decides to ditch his old self, adopt a new personality and a new family.

Cast
Ric Hutton as the Traveller
Enid Lorimer as the Mother
Rhod Walker as the brother George
Patricia Kennedy as the maid
Clarissa Kaye as the sister in law Valerie
Gordon Glenwright as Butler
Brian Gilbert as Small Boy
Robert McDarra as psychiatrist

Production
The play had been performed at the Sydney University Drama Society in June 1960.

Reception
The critic from The Sydney Morning Herald wrote that the production was marked by "competence rather than exciting path-finding... Desmonde Downing_'s sets rank with the best one has seen in A.B.C. productions; and George Kerr's adaptation of the play, while it reduced many interesting subsidiary threads, nevertheless fairly happily retained the essence of the writing."

References

External links

Australian television films
Australian Broadcasting Corporation original programming
Black-and-white Australian television shows
English-language television shows
Films directed by Henri Safran
1961 television films
1961 films
1960s English-language films